Oettinger may refer to:

 Anthony Oettinger, a computer scientist
 Günther Oettinger, (born 1953), a German and EU politician
 Jake Oettinger, (born 1998), American ice hockey goalie
 Konrad Öttinger, Reformation-era German Protestant theologian
 Oettinger Brewery, a brewery group based in Oettingen
 a resident of Oettingen in Bayern
 Oettinger (car tuner and builder), mostly known for building Volkswagen based products